Alvin Abdul Halim Nasution (born 15 August 1998) is an Indonesian professional footballer who plays as a central midfielder for Liga 2 club Sriwijaya.

Club career

Persiraja Banda Aceh
He was signed for Persiraja Banda Aceh to play in the Liga 1 in the 2021 season. Alvin made his league debut on 7 January 2022 in a match against PSS Sleman at the Ngurah Rai Stadium, Denpasar.

Career statistics

Club

Notes

References

External links
 Alvin Abdul Halim at Soccerway
 Alvin Abdul Halim at Liga Indonesia

1998 births
Living people
Indonesian footballers
Persiraja Banda Aceh players
Association football midfielders
People from Bireuën Regency
Sportspeople from Aceh